Chambersburg is a neighborhood located within the city of Trenton in Mercer County, New Jersey, United States. It is considered part of South Trenton. Chambersburg was an independent municipality from 1872 to 1888.

Chambersburg was named for Robert Chambers, a founder of the area, whose family is memorialized by the local Chambers Street. Chambers died in 1865, shortly before the borough was created.

Chambersburg was incorporated as a borough by an act of the New Jersey Legislature on April 2, 1872, from portions of Hamilton Township. On March 27, 1874, the municipality was reincorporated as the Borough of Chambersburg Township. On May 1, 1888, Chambersburg was annexed to Trenton.

Chambersburg is the home of fictional bounty hunter Stephanie Plum, a character created by author Janet Evanovich. A significant portion of each of the novels featuring Plum takes place in or around "The 'Burg."

Industrial heritage

John A. Roebling, the builder of the Brooklyn Bridge, founded his wire making company in the neighborhood along the Delaware and Raritan Canal, now covered by Route 129, in 1849.  Under the leadership of his sons the company grew to be Trenton's largest employer, with a massive industrial complex on the western side of Chambersburg.  Operations ceased at the plant in 1974, with parts having undergone adaptive reuse and others awaiting redevelopment.  Two different parts of the complex have been listed on the National Register of Historic Places, the Roebling Machine Shop, and John A. Roebling's Sons Company, Trenton N.J., Block 3.

Community 

During most of the 20th century, Chambersburg was widely regarded as the "Italian section" of the city of Trenton and featured numerous family-owned Italian restaurants, bakeries, butchers and grocery stores. An annual Feast of Lights was held centrally in Chambersburg. Over the years, however, the wave of Italian immigrants that shaped the neighborhood died out, their descendants left the area and most of the businesses that catered to their needs closed.

Since the decline of the Italian community, many newer immigrants have come to the neighborhood. Today Chambersburg has Trenton's largest Latino community. Many of the immigrants come from Guatemala, Costa Rica, and Ecuador.  The Puerto Rican population has decreased slightly but is still present in Chambersburg.

Current points of interest include St. Francis Medical Center, Columbus Park and Immaculate Conception Church.

Remnants of the Italian Community can still be found at Panorama Musicale and Italian Peoples Bakery and Our Lady of the Angels Parish, which is what the Italian National parish of St. Joachim's was renamed in 2005. This Little Italy section of Trenton has also gained numerous Italian restaurants in recent years.

Gallery

References

1872 establishments in New Jersey
1888 disestablishments in New Jersey
Former municipalities in Mercer County, New Jersey
Former townships in New Jersey
Neighborhoods in Trenton, New Jersey
Populated places established in 1872
Little Italys in the United States